The Wilderness is an album by the Canadian alt-country band Cowboy Junkies, released in 2012. It is Volume Four of the Nomad Series. This volume is the introspection of winter after Sing in My Meadows joyful visitation of spring.

 Background 
The album is a return to the folk vibe the band played with in the late 80s and early 90s.  The songwriter, Michael Timmins, "started to think in terms of an album of songs reflecting on the lives of characters I'd written about early in the band’s career and bringing those characters 20 years into the future to see where their lives were at now. Some of those songs have little touch points where, if you're a real freak and analyze the music, you can see how they connect to earlier songs -- even character's names and stuff pops into them, and that's intentional. It was fun to sit and go over those older songs and some of the ideas I was thinking about and exploring and believed in and seeing 20 years later where I sit with some of those ideas. It's always fascinating to do that with yourself and with the songs. It's a treat for me, anyway." The style of the songs on the album resemble earlier Cowboy Junkies music more than the other albums in the Nomad series. The Cowboy Junkies had turned their back on major labels, which gave them the independence to explore various themes for the Nomad series, to experiment with their music.

 Track listing 

 Personnel Cowboy JunkiesMargo Timmins – lead vocals
Michael Timmins – guitar
Alan Anton – bass
Peter Timmins – drumsAdditional musiciansJeff Bird – mandolin
Matt Bailey – guitar
Miranda Mulholland – violin
Joby Baker – bowed bass, drums, organ, piano, Wurlitzer, background vocals
Michael Davidson – vibraphone
Jesse O'Brien – organ, piano, WurlitzerProduction'
Michael Timmins – producer, engineer, mixed by
Peter J. Moore – mastered at the E Room
Alice Phieu – graphics design
Enrique Martinez Celaya – cover image

References 

2012 albums
Cowboy Junkies albums
Latent Recordings albums